Lemerje (Prekmurje Slovene: Lömergje) is a village in the Municipality of Puconci in the Prekmurje region of Slovenia.

There are two chapels in the settlement. The Lutheran chapel, built in the Neogothic style in 1925, is on the north side of the main road. The Catholic chapel was built in 1928, also in the Neogothic style, and is dedicated to the Holy Cross.

Notable people
Notable people that were born or lived in Lemerje include:
Mátyás Godina (ca. 1768–1835), writer

References

External links
Lemerje on Geopedia

Populated places in the Municipality of Puconci